Marcy Hamby Towns is an American chemist who is Professor of Chemistry Education at Purdue University. Her research considers the development of innovative ways to teach undergraduate chemistry. She was awarded the IUPAC Distinguished Women in Chemistry Award in 2021.

Early life and education 
Towns is the daughter of a chemist. She was an undergraduate student at Linfield University and moved to Purdue University for graduate studies. After completing college, she started teaching chemistry at Valley Catholic School, where she became interested in chemistry education.

Research and career 
Towns joined the chemistry department at Ball State University in 1995. She taught chemistry in Indiana for twelve years, after which she returned to the faculty at Purdue University and developed a research program in chemistry education and evidence-based learning. She is particularly interested in undergraduate chemistry teaching and laboratory assessment.

Awards and honors 
 2009 Fellow of the American Association for the Advancement of Science
 2013 Murphy Award
 2017 American Chemical Society James Flack Norris Award
 2019 Royal Society of Chemistry Nyholm Prize for Education
 2020 American Chemical Society Outstanding Service to the Division Award
 2021 IUPAC Distinguished Women in Chemistry
 2021 Morrill Award

Selected publications

References 

Living people
American women chemists
Year of birth missing (living people)
Place of birth missing (living people)
Purdue University faculty
21st-century American chemists
Purdue University alumni
Linfield University alumni
Ball State University faculty
Fellows of the American Association for the Advancement of Science
20th-century American chemists
20th-century American women scientists
21st-century American women scientists